The Siberian elm cultivar Ulmus pumila 'Ansaloni' was raised by the Ansaloni Nurseries , Bologna, c. 1933, from a tree introduced from the Far East in 1930.

Description
'Ansaloni' is a quick-growing variety with a compact crown, holding its leaves well into autumn.

Pests and diseases
See under Ulmus pumila.

Cultivation
The tree was sold mostly to winegrowers in the Po valley,  who were still using traditional Roman cultivation methods after the Second World War, but the advent of mechanization in the 1950s brought about the tree's decline, and it had been withdrawn from commerce by the 1970s. One specimen is known to remain in cultivation in North America (see Accessions).

Synonymy
'Siber-Ansaloni': Ansaloni Nurseries, Bologna, Italy, Catalogue, 1946–47, p. 28.

Accessions

North America
Arnold Arboretum, US. Acc. no. 636-61 (accession date: 2 May 1961) grown from seed in US collected from 'Ansaloni'.

References

Siberian elm cultivar
Ulmus articles with images